HMS Firm was a 16-gun  of the Royal Navy, launched in 1794. The two-vessel class was intended to operate in shallow waters. After the Peace of Amiens Firm was paid off in March 1802; she was sold in 1803.

Service
Sir John Henslow designed the class on the model of flat-bottomed Thames barges. Commander Temple Hardy commissioned Firm in June 1794. Commander Robert Plampin replaced him in September, for Ostend and Flushing. In August 1795 she came under the command of Commander John Edwards for the Leith station. She was paid off in February 1796 at Sheerness.

Commander Horace Pine recommissioned her in September and she was stationed at Chatham to protect the River Medway. On 2 and 3 June 1797, during the Spithead and Nore mutinies, Firm was at Shellness. The ringleader of the mutiny, Richard Parker, put a man, Thomas Appleyard, aboard her to take command of her. However the crew did not join the mutiny and instead Firm sailed to Sheerness and anchored by the Half Moon Battery and then by the Grain Spit to act against the mutiny if necessary. Appleyard later received a court martial and was hanged aboard Firm, then at Gillingham Reach.

Commander Patrick Campbell replaced Pine in June 1798. On 21 August 1799 Bulkeley Mackworth Praed, newly released from enemy custody, was promoted to Commander on Firm, which served in the Channel. She was at Sheerness from March 1800 on, with Praed remaining with her. In March 1802 she was paid off. Praed received promotion to post captain on 29 April 1802.

Fate
Firm was sold to Mr. F. Hurry for £525 on 30 March 1803.

Notes, citations, and references

Notes

Citations

References
Cunningham, Sir Charles (1829) A Narrative of Occurrences that Took Place During the Mutiny at the Nore, in the Months of May and June, 1797: With a Few Observations Upon the Impressment of Seamen, and the Advantages of Those who are Employed in His Majesty's Navy; Also on the Necessity and Useful Operations of the Articles of War. (W. Burrill). 
Herbert, David (1876) Great Historical Mutinies: Comprising the Mutiny of the Bounty, the Mutiny at Spithead, the Mutiny at the Nore, Mutinies in Highland Regiments and the Indian Mutiny. (W.P. Nimmo).

External links
 

Gunvessels of the Royal Navy
1794 ships
Ships built in Deptford